Petrovci may refer to:

Places
 Petrovci, Croatia, a place in Croatia
 Donji Petrovci, a village in Serbia
 Gornji Petrovci, a town and a municipality in Slovenia
 Murski Petrovci, a place in Slovenia

People
 Enver Petrovci, an Albanian actor, writer and director